Omer Berck (born 5 February 1895, date of death unknown) was a Belgian fencer. He competed in the individual sabre competitions at the 1924 Summer Olympics.

References

External links
 

1895 births
Year of death missing
Belgian male fencers
Belgian sabre fencers
Olympic fencers of Belgium
Fencers at the 1924 Summer Olympics